ALWD may refer to:
 Association of Legal Writing Directors, a nonprofit professional association of directors and former directors of legal research, writing, analysis, and advocacy programs from law schools in the United States, Canada and Australia
 ALWD Guide to Legal Citation (formerly ALWD Citation Manual), a style guide providing a legal citation system for the United States compiled by the Association of Legal Writing Directors